Poland participated at the 2015 Summer Universiade in Gwangju, South Korea.

Medal summary

Medal by sports

Medalists

References
 Country overview: Poland on the official website

Nations at the 2015 Summer Universiade
2015
2015 in Polish sport